Ralph Lee Stevenson (April 11, 1917 – July 7, 1987) was an American football guard. A native of Ponca City, Oklahoma, he played college football for Oklahoma. He was a member of the 1938 Oklahoma Sooners football team that was undefeated in the regular season. He was selected by the  Cleveland Rams in the 18th round (165th overall pick) of the 1940 NFL Draft. He appeared in three NFL games. He died at age 70 in Norman, Oklahoma.

References

1917 births
1987 deaths
Cleveland Rams players
Oklahoma Sooners football players
Players of American football from Oklahoma